The Worst of Hollywood was a 1983 television series presented by Michael Medved and screened on Channel 4.

Overview
Following the success of his Golden Turkey Awards books Medved had become a popular guest on British TV chat shows. The series screened late on a Friday night in what became established as Channel 4's slot for 'post pub television'. In each programme, Medved would introduce that week's B movie with a comedic lecture to a studio audience pointing out flaws in the film and relating funny stories about the production. This format contrasted with the established 'high art' approach to presenting cinema of the BBC channels. Following a commercial break, the film would be shown with humorous subtitles and captions pointing up poor special effects and dialogue.

Films featured
The featured films were:

Plan 9 from Outer Space
The Creeping Terror
The Wild Women of Wongo
They Saved Hitler's Brain 
Mars Needs Women 
Godzilla vs. The Smog Monster
The Thing With Two Heads
Eegah 
Robot Monster
Santa Claus Conquers the Martians - the Christmas edition

After the film, Medved would return with a short summary concluding each week with ..the worst is yet to come.

Medved's opening lectures usually followed the line that there was only a narrow distinction between critically panned films such as these and the types of films Hollywood continued to produce.

Production
The series was produced by Stephen Woolley, with the opening lectures being filmed at the Scala Cinema he owned and managed. The commercial breaks usually featured adverts for cult films being distributed by Woolley's Palace Video.

Clive James' documentary
The ten-week run was preceded by a one-hour documentary presented by Clive James, who was already established as Channel 4's critic in residence and featuring Medved as an expert. The documentary included clips from more cult and underground films that UK television could not screen at that time.

Legacy
The popularity of the series encouraged the Channel to embrace programming more Cult film and commission similar late night strands presented by Jonathan Ross.

See also
Mystery Science Theater 3000
The Canned Film Festival

1983 British television series debuts
1983 British television series endings
Motion picture television series
Channel 4 original programming